Baskhari is a town (Village Panchayat Block) located in Ambedkar Nagar district in the Indian state of Uttar Pradesh.

Demographics
 India census, Baskhari had a population of 18,485. Males constitute 50% of the population and females 50%. Baskhari has an average literacy rate of 65%, higher than the national average of 59.5%: male literacy is 78%, and female literacy is 59%. In Baskhari, 13% of the population is under 6 years of age.
Akbarpur, Ambedkar Nagar, Tanda, Ambedkar Nagar, Mau, Sahjanwa, Azamgarh, Rajesultanpur, Hanswar, Jahangir Ganj, are the nearby Cities to Baskhari.

References 

Cities and towns in Ambedkar Nagar district